Contessa is a 2018 Philippine television drama revenge series broadcast by GMA Network. Directed by Albert Langitan, it stars Glaiza de Castro in the title role. It premiered on March 19, 2018, on the network's Afternoon Prime and Sabado Star Power sa Hapon line up replacing Ika-6 na Utos. The series concluded on September 8, 2018, with a total of 147 episodes. It was replaced by Ika-5 Utos in its timeslot.

The series is streaming online on YouTube.

Premise
Bea gets accused and imprisoned for a crime she did not commit, is determined to seek revenge on the people who took everything and everyone she loved away from her. She claims a new identity as Contessa and will seek for redemption and justice.

Cast and characters

Lead cast
 Glaiza de Castro as Beatrice “Bea” Resureccion - Caballero / Contessa Venganza 

Supporting cast
 Geoff Eigenmann as Gabriel R. Caballero
 Jak Roberto as Santiago "Jong" Generoso Jr.
 Gabby Eigenmann as Victorino "Vito" C. Imperial Jr. / Duquessa Dolce Vita
 Lauren Young as Daniella "Dani" C. Imperial
 Chanda Romero as Charito Castillo vda. de Imperial / Black Scorpion
 Tetchie Agbayani as Guadalupe "Guada" Sarmiento vda. de Venganza / Dragona / Queen V.
 Leandro Baldemor as Santiago "Tiago" Generoso Sr.
 Dominic Roco as Oliver Sta. Ana
 Bernadette Allyson as Sarah Imperial
 Melissa Mendez as Helen Ramirez vda. de Caballero
 Mon Confiado as Armando "Arman" Wilwayco
 Tanya Gomez as Linda Resurreccion
 Karel Marquez as Virginia "Gigi" Palaroan
 Phytos Ramirez as Winston Mallari
 Denise Barbacena as Miadora Jimenez
 Will Ashley De Leon as Elijah "Ely" Resureccion Venganza 

Guest cast 
 Mark Herras as Marco R. Caballero
 Toby Alejar as Atty. Cordero
 Shermaine Santiago as a fortune teller
 J-mee Katanyag as Mayora Angela
 Antonette Garcia as Chunna
 Angeli Bayani as Yolly
 Andrea Torres as Contessa Venganza
 Al Tantay as Pablo Venganza
 Jay Arcilla as Jonas Zamora
 Patricia Tumulak as Marga Antonio
 Mike Magat as Lamberto "Berto" Zamora
 Divine Tetay as Misha Wilton
 Shaira Diaz as Ces Hidalgo
 Tyler Gatdula as Harold Villarama
 Philip Lazaro as Marusca
 Janice Hung as Mystie
 Nicole Donesa as Monique
 Stephanie Sol as Lara
 Roi Vinzon as Felipe
 Paolo Gumabao as Jigo
 Neil Ryan Sese as Detective Eric
 Ervic Vijandre as Enzo
 Max Collins as Perfida Ledesma
 Joshua Zamora as Jimmy / Paul
 Elizabeth Oropesa as Rowena

Accolades

Ratings
According to AGB Nielsen Philippines' Nationwide Urban Television Audience Measurement People in television homes, the pilot episode of Contessa earned a 5.2% rating.

References

External links
 
 

2018 Philippine television series debuts
2018 Philippine television series endings
Filipino-language television shows
GMA Network drama series
Television series about revenge
Television shows set in the Philippines